Heinrich XI, Prince Reuss of Greiz (18 March 172228 June 1800) was the first Prince Reuss of Greiz from 1778 to 1800.

Early life
Heinrich XI was born at Greiz, Reuss, youngest child of Count Heinrich II Reuss-Obergreiz (1696–1722), (son of Heinrich VI, Count Reuss-Greiz and Baroness Henriette Amalie von Friesen) and his wife, Countess Sophie Charlotte von Bothmer (1697–1748), (daughter of Count Hans Kaspar von Bothmer and Gisela Erdmuth von Hoym).

Succession to Obergreiz and Untergreiz 
Heinrich succeeded his brother Henry IX as Count of Reuss-Obergreiz 17 March 1723. After the death of Count Henry III Reuss-Untergreiz, in 1768, including the city of Untergreiz passed to the domains of the Heinrich XI and he was able to gather these possessions and guaranteed the line of succession.

Prince Reuss of Greiz
On 12 May 1778 Heinrich was elevated to Prince of the Holy Roman Empire by the Holy Roman Emperor Joseph II. He received the Order of Saint Stephen of Hungary as well.

First marriage and issue 
Heinrich XI married on 4 April 1743 in Köstritz to Countess Conradine Reuss-Köstritz (1719–1770), youngest daughter of Heinrich XXIV, Count Reuss of Köstritz, and his wife, Baroness Marie Eleonore Emma von Promnitz-Dittersbach.

They had eleven children:
Count Heinrich XII of Reuss-Greiz (25 April 1744 – 30 December 1745)
Countess Amalie of Reuss-Greiz (25 October 1745 – 3 October 1748)
Heinrich XIII, Prince Reuss-Greiz (16 February 1747 – 29 January 1817), married in 1786 to Princess Wilhelmine Louise of Nassau-Weilburg, had issue.
Princess Friederike of Reuss-Greiz (9 July 1748 – 14 June 1816), married firstly in 1767 to Friedrich Ludwig, Count of Castell-Rüdenhausen, no issue, divorced in 1769; Married secondly in 1770 to Friedrich Wilhelm, Fürst zu Hohenlohe-Kirchberg, no issue.
Prince Heinrich XIV of Reuss-Greiz (6 November 1749 – 12 February 1799), married morganatically in 1797 to Marie Anne Meyer, no issue.
Prince Heinrich XV of Reuss-Greiz (22 February 1751 – 30 August 1825)
Princess Isabelle Auguste of Reuss-Greiz (7 August 1752 – 10 October 1824), married in 1771 to Burgrave Wilhelm Georg of Kirchberg-Hachenburg, had issue.
Countess Marie of Reuss-Greiz (1 November 1754 – 28 September 1759)
Princess Viktoria of Reuss-Greiz (20 January 1756 – 2 December 1819), married in 1783 to Wolfgang Ernst II, Prince of Isenburg und Büdingen zu Birstein, no issue.
Count Heinrich XVI of Reuss-Greiz (30 August 1759 – 13 December 1763)
Prince Heinrich XVII of Reuss-Greiz (25 May 1761 – 27 February 1807), married morganatically in 1805 to Babette von Wenz, issue: Isabelle von Wenz zum Lahnstein (1806-1886).

Second marriage 
Heinrich married secondly on 25 October 1770 in Frankfurt am Main to Countess Alexandrine of Leiningen-Dagsburg-Heidesheim (1732–1809), second daughter of Christian Karl Reinhard, Count of Leiningen-Dagsburg-Heidesheim, and his wife, Countess Catharine Polyxene of Solms-Rödelheim und Assenheim; they had no issue.

Ancestry

Notes and sources
Ancestors of Queen Juliana, Jaarboek Centraal Bureau Genealogie, Den Haag, Reference: 246
L'Allemagne dynastique, Huberty, Giraud, Magdelaine, Reference: 309
Les 256 quartiers genealogiques de Jacques Henri VI, chef de la maison de France, 1980., Vollet, Charles, Reference: 174

1722 births
1800 deaths
People from Greiz (district)
Princes of Reuss
Grand Crosses of the Order of Saint Stephen of Hungary